Soviet industrial espionage of the Concorde programme is alleged to have been carried out from 1959 to 1976. Not all allegations have been verified, but documents from Sud Aviation and BAC development did reach Soviet hands. The resulting Tupolev Tu-144 ultimately made 102 commercial flights, 55 of those with passengers, with no more passenger flights following a crash on 23 May 1978.

Background
The Concorde project was a civil aircraft, so was not subject to typical government secrecy.

Although the Tu-144 does show great similarities with Concorde, and was designed and developed concurrently, it was not a direct copy, as has often been alleged. But, due to harsh self-imposed constraints of time, there were attempts by Soviet insiders to gain access to technological secrets of the development of Concorde. These constraints of time on the Tu-144 development would lead to disaster - its development was only half-finished, and due to safety it had limited passenger service for a few months in early 1978.

Vasili Mitrokhin, a Russian agent who defected, had documents showing that information on Concorde had been obtained.

On 5 June 1969, the Tu-144 broke the sound barrier, with Concorde doing the same on 1 October 1969.
The Tu-144 passed Mach 2 on 26 May 1970.

On Thursday 22 August 1996, Channel 4 broadcast an hour-long documentary Konkordski about the Soviet espionage of Concorde.

Imitative Soviet aircraft
The Soviets had taken inspiration from the design of British airliners on earlier occasions.

 Ilyushin Il-62 (January 1963) - Vickers VC10 (June 1962)
 Tupolev Tu-154 (October 1968) - Trident (January 1962)

Arrests
 Sergei Fabiev (Serge Fabiew) had worked in conjunction with the GRU since 1962, and was arrested on 15 March 1977 when about to board a plane at Orly Airport, after decoded messages from Moscow had congratulated him on obtaining the complete plans of Concorde. On 1 February 1978 he was sentenced to twenty years in prison
 MI6 and the CIA informed the DST that Sergei Pavlov needed to be watched closely. On 1 February 1965 Pavlov was due to meet a contact at La Flambée restaurant, and inadvertently sat opposite a DST agent and the agent's stooge female companion for two hours. Pavlov was arrested as he attempted to leave the restaurant, with the blueprints of Concorde's landing gear and anti-lock brakes being found with his belongings. He was deported from France in 1965, travelling back to Moscow to become the deputy minister for civil aviation
 Czech Jean Sarrady was arrested by the Direction de la surveillance du territoire (DST) in January 1966, when disguised as a Catholic priest, and received four years in prison
 Jean-Paul Soupert, a Swiss retired chemist, was arrested in January 1964 by the Belgian secret service - he had been trained by the GDR, and travelled between East Germany and Belgium

Effect on the design of the Tu-144
The Tu-144 and Concorde were structurally different aircraft designs, so any information acquired about Concorde may not have been able to be directly incorporated in the Tupolev aircraft, anyway. The Tu-144 was 3.7m longer, and was designed to fly faster than Concorde.

The Tu-144 did not have vortices over its wing to provide extra lift at low speed. There were no overseas demonstration sales flights, which Concorde had attempted. The engines were not flight tested before the Tu-144 had first flown.

It was structural failure of the Tupolev aircraft, in a steep dive, that led to catastrophe at an international air show.

References

External links
 Development of the Tu-144, October 2017
 Cold War and Concorde

Aviation history of France
Aviation history of the United Kingdom
Concorde
Espionage scandals and incidents
Industrial history of France
Industrial history of the United Kingdom
Soviet Union intelligence operations
Trade secrets
Tupolev